Vincent Restencourt (born 28 July 1981) is a French former competitive figure skater. He is a three-time World Junior medalist, the 1998-1999 Junior Grand Prix Final champion, the 1999 Trophée Lalique silver medalist, and the 2000 Ondrej Nepela Memorial champion.

Career 
Restencourt started to skate at the age of 6, having been introduced to the activity by his sister, who also competed in figure skating. He represented the Champigny club and was coached by André Brunet. He was the first French skater to land a quadruple jump, a toe loop, in competition.

During the 1997–98 ISU Junior Series, Restencourt won silver in Ukraine and bronze in Hungary to qualify for the Junior Series Final, where he finished fourth.

Restencourt began the 1998–99 season on the Junior Grand Prix (JGP) series, winning gold in Saint-Gervais-les-Bains, France and then in Chemnitz, Germany. In November 1998, he competed at the 1999 World Junior Championships in Zagreb, Croatia. Ranked third in his qualifying group, first in the short program, and second in the free skate, he was awarded the silver medal behind Russia's Ilia Klimkin. In January 1999, he finished 8th at his first senior ISU Championship, the European Championships in Prague, Czech Republic. In March, he won gold at the JGP Final.

In February 2000, Restencourt finished tenth at the European Championships in Vienna, Austria. In March, he won the silver medal at the 2000 World Junior Championships in Oberstdorf, Germany, placing second to Germany's Stefan Lindemann after ranking third in his qualifying group, third in the short, and first in the free. Later that month, he placed ninth at the 2000 World Championships in Nice, France.

At the 2001 World Junior Championships in Sofia, Bulgaria, Restencourt placed second in his qualifying group, sixth in the short, and second in the free. He won the bronze medal behind Americans Johnny Weir and Evan Lysacek.

He coached American figure skater Gracie Gold. Restencourt no longer coaches figure skating in Aston, PA.

Programs

Competitive highlights
GP: Grand Prix; JGP: Junior Series/Junior Grand Prix

References

External links

Navigation

1981 births
Living people
French male single skaters
World Junior Figure Skating Championships medalists
People from Louviers
French emigrants to the United States
Sportspeople from Eure